Cottus koreanus is a species of freshwater ray-finned fish belonging to the family Cottidae, the typical sculpins. It is endemic to Korea. It reaches a maximum length of 8.2 cm.

References 

Fish of Korea
Cottus (fish)
Fish described in 2005